The Cromarty Bridge is a road bridge over the Cromarty Firth in Scotland.

History

Design
The bridge joins a junction with the B9163 to the south in Ross and Cromarty with a junction with the A862 to the north at Ardullie Point. It can clearly be seen from the north from the Far North Line.

Construction
The £4.5 million contract for the bridge was awarded in November 1976 from the Scottish Development Department.

The parapets were built by of Hi-Fab Ltd of Muir of Ord. The waterproofing was by Sifran Civil Engineering Ltd of Stourbridge. The site investigation was by Wimpey Laboratories of Broxburn, West Lothian.

A temporary structure was pushed out over the bridge piers, and from this, five pre-stressed concrete beams were placed between each pier. The temporary structure was removed and the road deck made with concrete.

Opening
The bridge was opened from the southern end on 12 April 1979. It became part of the A9 in 1982.

References

External links
 Cromarty Bridge

Video clips
 Construction

1979 establishments in Scotland
Bridges completed in 1979
Bridges in Highland (council area)
Concrete bridges in the United Kingdom
Road bridges in Scotland
Ross and Cromarty
Black Isle